Ward Hill is a hill on the island of Hoy in Orkney, Scotland.

The hill forms a curved ridge, reminiscent of a 'J' in shape. The lower slopes are covered in heather and grass, though the top of the ridge is covered in small stones with bare sandy soil. The highest summit is towards the northern end and is crowned by a trig point. The ridge is well separated from the other hills of Hoy, and both the other Marilyns on the island have high topographic prominence. Ward Hill is separated from Cuilags by the Glens of Kinnaird, and from Knap of Trowieglen by the glen carrying the road between Moaness and Rackwick, in which lies the Dwarfie Stane.

Ward Hill may be climbed from a variety of starting points. The northern side, directly above Hoy Village is steep and craggy, and thus presents the least appealing ascent route.

The existence of Anastrepta orcadensis (also known as Orkney Notchwort), a liverwort found in the United States, Canada, and widely in Europe, was first discovered on Ward Hill by William Jackson Hooker in 1808.

References

Marilyns of Scotland
Mountains and hills of the Scottish islands
Protected areas of Orkney
Mountains and hills of Orkney
Highest points of historic Scottish counties
Hoy